Sandy Spring Friends School (SSFS) is a progressive, coeducational, college preparatory Quaker school serving students from preschool (age 3) through 12th grade. SSFS offers an optional 5- and 7- day boarding program in the Middle School and Upper School. 59% of its student body identifies as students of color, and 19 countries are represented in its boarding program. Founded in 1961, its motto is "Let Your Lives Speak" an old Quaker adage which expresses the school's philosophy of "educating all aspects of a person so that their life—in all of its facets—can reveal the unique strengths within."  SSFS sits on a pastoral 140-acre campus in the heart of Montgomery County, Maryland, approximately midway between Washington, D.C. and Baltimore. SSFS is under the care of the Sandy Spring Monthly Meeting and the Baltimore Yearly Meeting.

History 
The establishment of a Quaker school in the Sandy Spring community was first suggested by S. Brook Moore at a meeting for business of the Sandy Spring Friends Monthly Meeting in 1958. Although some were initially skeptical of the idea, the next day Brook received a $100 check and a group of concerned Friends formed a school committee shortly thereafter.  Esther Scott followed by donating several acres of her family farm for the school and an adjacent Friends Center.  Sam Legg, who had participated in the Minnesota Starvation Experiment while serving in the Civilian Public Service as a conscientious objector during World War II, was appointed the school's first headmaster in 1959.  SSFS opened its doors in September 1961 with 77 students in Grades 10 and 11.  Twelfth Grade was added a year later.

The school's first buildings were the Headmaster's home, named “Scott House” after Esther Scott, and a dormitory, named “Moore Hall” after Brook Moore, with room for 46 students.  The dormitory building also held two faculty apartments and classrooms, plus the school's kitchen and dining room, library, laboratory and lockers on the lower level.  The school quickly outgrew the original buildings, and over the next decade additional classrooms, an arts center, faculty housing, an infirmary and a second dormitory with expanded kitchen and dining facilities were constructed.

In 1973, a 9th Grade program was added, with classes initially held in the nearby Sandy Spring Community House; the 9th Grade was brought onto the main campus in 1990.  In 1980 SSFS expanded to include a middle school, and the lower school was added as a result of the 1993 merger with Friends Elementary School.

Connections With Other Friends Schools 

The establishment of SSFS was preceded by the Sherwood Friends School (also known as Sherwood Academy) as the first Quaker school located in Sandy Spring, from 1883 to 1906.  After 1906, Sherwood Academy became part of the Montgomery County  public school system, eventually becoming the Sherwood High School.  Sherwood Academy occupied the old Ashton (Orthodox Quaker) Meeting House, which was later relocated to the SSFS campus.

The nearby Thornton Friends School, named after former Sandy Spring Friends Head of School C. Thornton Brown,  traces its roots to an innovative academic program, the “Interlocking Curriculum,” that was first developed at SSFS in 1973.

Sandy Spring Friends School annually sends students to QYLC (Quaker Youth Leadership Conference) which connects students from Quaker schools in the area on the basis of leadership, community, and Quaker traditions.

Sandy Spring Friends School also plays host to an annual "Friendly Dance Exchange" which was spearheaded by faculty member, Hannah Kerr. Along with Sidwell Friends School and the Friends School of Baltimore, the Dance Programs of the three schools are brought together for a day of community building through dance and choreography workshops.

Heads of School 

 Sam Legg (1961–64)
 John H. Burrowes (1964–66)
 C. Thornton ("Thorny") Brown, Jr. (1966†-79)
 Edwin E. Hinshaw (1979–91)
 Stephen L. Gessner (1991–96)
 Kenneth W. Smith (1996-2010)
 Tom Gibian (2010-2020)
 Rodney Glasgow (2020 - )
†Administrator from 1966–67; appointed Head in 1968

Academics 
SSFS is accredited by the Association of Independent Maryland Schools and approved by the Maryland Department of Education.  It is a member of the Friends Council on Education and the National Association of Independent Schools, among others.  The SSFS curriculum is intended to prepare students not only for entering college but also for being valuable citizens of the world.  It stresses the challenge of Quaker values, academic excellence, and personal growth in an environment that stresses personal responsibility.  Approximately 15% of the students are Quaker.

The Lower School (Pre-K to Grade 5) curriculum includes basic skills in reading, mathematics, science, art, music and languages, as well as conflict resolution and Quakerism. Children are encouraged to apply these skills to other life contexts, to think analytically, and to evaluate in both verbal and quantitative areas.

The Middle School (Grades 6-8) offers a curriculum of English, general mathematics and algebra, social studies, science, foreign language, art, music and sports.  Other activities include field trips, art and music programs, and science activities.

The Upper School (Grades 9-12) has a daily schedule that includes seven academic periods, lunch, and an academic help period which is designated time at the end of each day for students to meet with teachers before sports practices begin.  The average class size is 14 with a faculty-to-student ratio of 1:7.  A 5- and 7-day boarding program is offered in the Upper School.

SSFS offers a specialized program for international students.  The school's International Students Program (ISP) includes English as a Second Language (ESL) classes, including an ESL/English transition course, ESL Science, ESL American History, and ESL World History.  International students are placed in regular classes according to their level of English proficiency, and all receive preparation and practice for the TOEFL and other standardized tests.

To graduate, students must earn 24 credits, including English (4), foreign language (3), history (3), mathematics (3), science (3), electives (3), and fine arts (3).  Additional requirements (noncredit) include two physical activities each year and a semester-long course on Quakerism, fulfilled by the Life Skills course built into the 9th grade curriculum.  One Hundred hours of community service, broken down to fifty hours of outside of school community service and 50 hours of stewardship on the school's campus are also required prior to  graduation.  Full-year courses are offered in English, French, Spanish, Mandarin, history, algebra, geometry, pre-calculus, calculus, statistics, biology, chemistry, physics, geology, art (including drawing, painting, ceramics and fiber arts), orchestra, chorus, theater/musical production, modern dance and wood shop.  Advanced Placement courses are available in Environmental science, music theory, English (both AP Literature and AP Language), history, government and politics, calculus, statistics, chemistry, French and Spanish.

Facilities 
The wooded campus includes a stream, pond (which was made safe for swimming in 2011), meadows, and several athletic fields.  The physical plant includes a historic Quaker Meetinghouse, a science center, a performing arts building with a fine arts wing, an athletic complex that includes a fitness center, training room, and a  gymnasium, an expanded Lower School, a new Middle School building, a dormitory and dining hall, three major classroom buildings, a large resource center with a 25,000-volume library, an observatory, classrooms, and computer lab, an administration building and faculty housing in 2005 the addition of a second gymnasium was added as well as a new Middle School building and new performing arts center. in 2011, a rock climbing wall was also added to the newer gymnasium.  Computers are integrated into many aspects of the curriculum. Each school division is equipped with its own computer lab, and every classroom is wired for network and Internet access.  The School's library includes computers for online research through online subscription reference tools and the Internet.

The historic wooden Ashton Meeting House (built 1881) was moved onto the SSFS campus in 1983, and a new library and gymnasium was constructed in 1987.  In 2005-2006, a new middle school building was added, as well as a new performing arts center and athletic facilities, along with substantial renovations to several of the existing buildings. A new high school facility is currently under construction to be put in effect at some point during the 2019-2020 school year.

Demographics 
Approximately 7% of the student body are Quakers.

Athletics 

The Middle School teams and the Upper School boys' and girls' athletic teams compete in the Potomac Valley Athletic Conference (PVAC);. SSFS offers the following varsity and junior-varsity sports:

 Women's: Cross Country; Volleyball (Varsity and JV); Soccer (Varsity and JV); Basketball; Track & Field; Tennis; and Lacrosse.
 Men's: Cross Country; Soccer (Varsity and JV); Basketball (Varsity & JV); Track & Field; Tennis; Lacrosse; and Baseball (Varsity and JV).
 Coed: Climbing, Golf, Wrestling, and Hockey (club team).

Traditions 
Some of SSFS's notable traditional activities, which date to the earliest days of the school, include the following:

 The Morley Games.  The whimsical outdoor games of Frazleerham, Hoop-a-Doop, Brindledorph, Nurdleybawl and Friedlefrappe were invented by Barry Morley, a long-time SSFS teacher.  The Morley Games, inspired by limited funds and facilities early in the school's history, made use of everyday objects, and continued to be played long after the introduction of soccer, lacrosse and other sports to the school's curriculum.  Brindledorph, a field hockey-like game, is played with ordinary brooms, and Hoop-a-Doop with old bicycle tires.  Nurdleybawl (a variation on tee-ball) uses a small rubber ball and sawed-off softball bat.  Frazleerham, a combination of rugby, soccer, basketball and ultimate Frisbee, is played with a soccer ball and wastepaper can (held by the “frazsnapper”) standing in a small enclosure (10’ x 10’ x  2’) or “rham” made of 2-by-4's.  In Friedlefrappe, a “friedlesphere” (a ball) is thrown up to a “friedlesnatcher” (goalie) standing on a “friedleplat” (an elevated platform) who attempts to catch it with a “friedlesnare” (a net on a pole), and defended by a “friedlefrapper” swinging a broom.
 Spirit Week.  Held within the first few weeks of the school year, this recent school tradition is a weeklong event that features a number of school-wide and division-wide activities, such as "Twin Day" (students dress alike), "Pajama Day" (come to school dressed in pajamas), “Green and Gold Day” (students and faculty are requested to wear green or yellow clothing), and "Crazy Hat and Hair Day."
 Community Day.   Held in the fall, Community Day began as "Mountain Day," in which the entire school would travel to nearby Sugarloaf Mountain for a picnic and a day of exploration.  In the mid-1970s the venue changed to Catoctin Quaker Camp.  As the size of the school grew and the logistics of transporting the entire school over long distances became more difficult, Mountain Day evolved into Community Day, a day of campus-based work projects (such as trail maintenance, tending to the community garden, and bus waxing races), followed by school-wide games.
 Our People, Our Planet Day. Similar to Community Day, Our People, Our Planet Day (formerly known as Earth Stewardship Day) is an all-school event held in the spring. Our People, Our Planet Day (OPOP Day) is a day dedicated to a dual focus of environmental literacy and greater understanding of the unique social, global, and cultural composition of all SSFS community members.
 Intersession.  In the week before spring break each school year, all SSFS Upper School students are required to participate in an Intersession, a trip of experiential learning that supplements the traditional school curriculum. Intersessions often involve community service, physical activity, or environmental stewardship. In the past, Intersession trips have gone to Florida, Senegal, Korea, Sicily, and numerous other locations.
 Strawberry Cowbake.  An end-of-year festival featuring a cookout and strawberry shortcake.

Student government and publications 
The Wildezine is an upper-school student newspaper.  Other student publications include a literary magazine and a yearbook.

The Torch Committee, the student government organization, includes day and boarding students, as well as faculty and administration representatives.  A Torch representative is invited to all faculty meetings, school business meetings and meetings of the Board of Trustees.

In addition, the student body also has several affinity groups for racial identity.

Notable alumni

 John Fogarty, Lead EPA Counsel, Deepwater Horizon oil spill litigation and settlements,
 Josh Joplin, musician
 Amy Michelson, actress/clothing designer
 Toshi Reagon, American folk/blues musician
 Robby Reider, musician
 Liz Lerman, (former SSFS dance faculty member)

See also 

 Religious Society of Friends
 List of Friends schools

References

External links

1961 establishments in Maryland
Boarding schools in Maryland
Educational institutions established in 1961
Private elementary schools in Maryland
Private high schools in Maryland
Private middle schools in Maryland
Quaker schools in Maryland
Schools in Montgomery County, Maryland